New Swabia (Norwegian and ) was a disputed Antarctic claim by Nazi Germany within the Norwegian territorial claim of Queen Maud Land and is now a cartographic name sometimes given to an area of Antarctica between 20°E and 10°W in Queen Maud Land. New Swabia was explored by Germany in early 1939 and named after that expedition's ship, itself named after the German region of Swabia.

Background
Like many other countries, Germany sent expeditions to the Antarctic region in the late 19th and early 20th centuries, most of which were scientific. The late 19th century expeditions to the Southern Ocean, South Georgia, the Kerguelen Islands, and the Crozet Islands were astronomical, meteorological, and hydrological, mostly in close collaboration with scientific teams from other countries. As the 19th century ended, Germany began to focus on Antarctica.

The first German expedition to Antarctica was the Gauss expedition from 1901 to 1903. Led by Arctic veteran and geology professor Erich von Drygalski, this was the first expedition to use a hot-air balloon in Antarctica. It also found and named Kaiser Wilhelm II Land. The second German Antarctic expedition (1911–1912) was led by Wilhelm Filchner with a goal of crossing Antarctica to learn if it was one piece of land. As happened with other such early attempts, the crossing failed before it even began. The expedition discovered and named the Luitpold Coast and the Filchner Ice Shelf. A German whaling fleet was put to sea in 1937 and, upon its successful return in early 1938, plans for a third German Antarctic expedition were drawn up.

German Antarctic Expedition (1938–1939)
The third German Antarctic Expedition (1938–1939) was led by Alfred Ritscher (1879–1963), a captain in the German Navy. The main purpose was to find an area in Antarctica for a German whaling station, as a way to increase Germany's production of fat. Whale oil was then the most important raw material for the production of margarine and soap in Germany and the country was the second largest purchaser of Norwegian whale oil, importing some 200,000 metric tonnes annually. Besides the disadvantage of being dependent on imports, it was thought that Germany would soon be at war, which was considered to put too much strain on Germany's foreign currency reserves. Another goal was to scout possible locations for a German naval base.

On 17 December 1938, the New Swabia Expedition left Hamburg for Antarctica aboard MS Schwabenland (a freighter built in 1925 and renamed in 1934 after the Swabia region in southern Germany) which could also carry and  catapult aircraft. The secret expedition had 33 members plus Schwabenlands crew of 24. On 19 January 1939, the ship arrived at the Princess Martha Coast, in an area which had lately been claimed by Norway as Queen Maud Land, and began charting the region. Nazi German flags were placed on the sea ice along the coast. Naming the area Neu-Schwabenland after the ship, the expedition established a temporary base and in the following weeks teams walked along the coast recording claim reservations on hills and other significant landmarks. Seven photographic survey flights were made by the ship's two Dornier Wal seaplanes named Passat and Boreas. About a dozen -long aluminum arrows, with  steel cones and three upper stabilizer wings embossed with swastikas, were airdropped onto the ice at turning points of the flight polygons (these arrows had been tested on the Pasterze glacier in Austria before the expedition). None of these have ever been recovered.  Eight more flights were made to areas of keen interest and on these trips, some of the photos were taken with colour film. Altogether they flew over hundreds of thousands of square kilometers and took more than 16,000 aerial photographs, some of which were published after the war by Ritscher. The ice-free Schirmacher Oasis, which now hosts the Maitri and Novolazarevskaya research stations, was spotted from the air by Richard Heinrich Schirmacher (who named it after himself) shortly before the Schwabenland left the Antarctic coast on 6 February 1939.

On its return trip to Germany, the expedition made oceanographic studies near Bouvet Island and Fernando de Noronha, arriving back in Hamburg on 11 April 1939. Meanwhile, the Norwegian government had learned about the expedition through reports from whalers along the coast of Queen Maud Land. Although some, notably Norwegian writer Bjarne Aagaard and German geographer Ernst Herrmann, have claimed that Germany never actually occupied the territory, it is well documented that Germany issued a decree about the establishment of a German Antarctic Sector called New Swabia after the expedition's return in August 1939.

Germany never advanced any territorial claims to the region, which were abandoned in 1945.

Geographic features mapped by the expedition

Because the area was first explored by a German expedition, the name Neuschwabenland (New Swabia) is still used for the region on some maps, as are many of the German names given to its geographic features. Some geographic features mapped by the expedition were not named until the Norwegian-British-Swedish Antarctic Expedition (NBSAE) (1949–1952), led by John Schjelderup Giæver. Others were not named until they were remapped from aerial photographs taken by the Norwegian Antarctic Expedition (1958–1959).

 Ahlmann Ridge
 Alan Peak
 Aurdalsegga Ridge
 Austvorren Ridge
 Boreas Nunatak
 Borg Massif
 Cape Sedov
 Conrad Mountains
 Dalsnatten Crag
 Drygalski Mountains
 Dvergen Hill
 Dyna Hill
 Filchner Mountains
 Fjellimellom Valley
 Fimbul Ice Shelf
 Gamaleya Rock
 Gessner Peak
 Gburek Peaks
 Gneiskopf Peak
 Gockel Ridge
 Habermehl Peak
 Herrmann Mountains
 Høghamaren Crag
 Horgebest Peak
 Hortebrekka Slope
 Horteflaket Névé
 Humboldt Mountains
 Isdalen Valley
 Isdalsegga Ridge
 Isfossnipa Peak
 Ising Glacier
 Isingsalen Saddle
 Isingufsa Bluff
 Istind Peak
 Kal'vets Rock
 Knut Rocks
 Kraul Mountains
 Kruber Rock
 Kvamsgavlen Cliff
 Kvitkleven Cirque
 Kvitskarvhalsen Saddle
 Låghamaren Cliff
 Lake Untersee
 Luna-Devyat' Mountain
 Mount Dallmann
 Mount Dobrynin
 Mount Krüger
 Mount Neustruyev
 Mount Zimmermann
 Mount Zuckerhut
 Mühlig-Hofmann Mountains
 New Swabia
 Orvin Mountains
 Payer Mountains
 Penck Trough
 Per Rock
 Petermann Ranges
 Preuschoff Range
 Rømlingsletta Flat
 Rindehallet Slope
 Ritscher Peak
 Ritscher Upland
 Saetet Cirque
 Sandeggtind Peak
 Schirmacher Oasis
 Schirmacher Ponds
 Shatskiy Hill
 Sjøbotnen Cirque
 Skaret Pass
 Skeidskar Gap
 Skimten Hill
 Slithallet Slope
 Sørskeidet Valley
 Stabben Mountain
 Steinbotnen Cirque
 Storeidet Col
 Storkvarvet Mountain
 Storsåtklubben Ridge
 Südliche Petermann Range
 Sverdrup Mountains
 Sverre Peak
 Terningen Peak
 Tindeklypa
 Torgny Peak
 Tysk Pass
 Utrista Rock
 Vestskotet Bluff
 Vorposten Peak
 Weyprecht Mountains
 Wohlthat Mountains
 Zhil'naya Mountain
 Zwiesel Mountain

Aftermath
Germany made no formal territorial claims to New Swabia. No whaling station or other lasting bases were built there by Germany until the Georg-von-Neumayer-Station, a research facility, was established in 1981. Germany's current Neumayer-Station III is also in the region. New Swabia is a cartographic area of Queen Maud Land which within Norway is administered as a Norwegian dependent territory under the Antarctic Treaty System by the Polar Affairs Department of the Ministry of Justice and the Police.

Conspiracy theories 
Neuschwabenland has been the subject of conspiracy theories for decades, some of them related to Nazi UFO claims. Most assert that, in the wake of the German expedition of 1938–39, a huge military base was built there. After the war, high-ranking Nazis, scientists, and elite military units are claimed to have survived there. The US and UK have supposedly been trying to conquer the area for decades, and to have used nuclear weapons in this effort. Proponents claim the base is sustained by hot springs providing energy and warmth.

The WDR radio play "Neuschwabenland-Symphonie" from 2012 takes up the conspiracy theories.

New Schwabenland has also been linked to many conspiracy theories linked with the firmament. The firmament is a conspiracy that involves the firmament stated in the Bible.

See also
 Esoteric Nazism
 List of Antarctic expeditions
 Operation Highjump
 Yamato Yukihara

References

Literature
 Murphy, D.T. (2002). German exploration of the polar world. A history, 1870–1940 Lincoln : University of Nebraska Press. ,

External links
 Photographs of the MS Schwabenland and its seaplanes 
 More photographs of the MS Schwabenland 
 Erich von Drygalski and the 1901–03 German Antarctic Expedition, Scott Polar Research Institute
 Wilhelm Filchner and the 1911–12 German Antarctic Expedition, Scott Polar Research Institute
 Kartographische Arbeiten und deutsche Namengebung in Neuschwabenland, Antarktis
 

History of Antarctica
Regions of Queen Maud Land
Research and development in Nazi Germany
Germany and the Antarctic
1938 in Antarctica
1939 in Antarctica
1939 establishments in Antarctica
1945 disestablishments in Antarctica
1939 establishments in Germany
1945 disestablishments in Germany